Novak Djokovic defeated Rafael Nadal in the final, 4–6, 6–3, 6–2 to win the men's singles tennis title at the 2011 Indian Wells Masters.

Ivan Ljubičić was the defending champion, but lost to Juan Martín del Potro in the second round.

Seeds
All seeds received a bye into the second round.

Qualifying

Draw

Finals

Top half

Section 1

Section 2

Section 3

Section 4

Bottom half

Section 5

Section 6

Section 7

Section 8

References
Main Draw

BNP Paribas Open - Men's Singles
2011 BNP Paribas Open